Promegantereon is an extinct genus of machairodont from the Miocene of Europe. It is one of the oldest machairodont cat species in the Smilodontini and is believed to be an ancestor of Megantereon and Smilodon.

Description
Promegantereon is one of the oldest known true saber-toothed cats. Its fossils were discovered in Cerro de los Batallones, a Late Miocene fossil site near Madrid, Spain. However, it was only known from skull fragments from Eppelsheim until the early 1990s when the Cerro de los Battlones fossil beds were discovered. The shape of its limbs suggests that it may have been an agile, scansorial climber, and could have hunted relatively large prey thanks to its elongate, flattened upper canines. In appearance it was highly similar to the contemporary Paramachairodus, so much so, they were and are often considered to be the same genus. However, due to its more primitive morphology as evidenced by Salesa et al. in 2002 with an in-depth description of its anatomy, Promegantereon ogygia is believed to be its own genus and species and therefore should remain separate from Paramachairodus.

Paleoecology  
Promegantereon seemed to prefer open woodland habitat, as evidenced by finds at Cerro de los Batallones, which is a fossil deposit of Vallesian age. As a predator at Batallones, it would have hunted many of the relatively large herbivores of the time as well as the young of much larger animals. Such herbivores that it could hunt would have included horses like Hipparion, young of the hornless rhinoceros Aceratherium and the proboscidean Tetralophodon, the suid Microstonyx, and possibly the calves of silvatherid giraffes and boselaphine antelopes. Promegantereon would have competed for such prey with the amphicyonid Magericyon, fellow machairodonts Machairodus and Paramachairodus, the bear Indarctos, and the small hyenid Protictitherium. While the much larger Indarctos, Machairodus and Magericyon would likely have been strongly competitive with for food and would likely have driven it from its kills when they sensed an opportunity, Paramachairodus and Protictitherium meanwhile, likely were less dangerous rivals that could be driven away or fought off.

Pathology 
The specimens of Promegantereon at Batallones indicate that high percentages of canine breaks were present in this species. This indicates that they hunted in a similar manner to modern cats, a method of hunting that was much riskier due to the lack of protruding incisors.

References 

Miocene mammals of Europe
Smilodontini
Prehistoric carnivoran genera